Remembrance Day (also known as Poppy Day owing to the tradition of wearing a remembrance poppy) is a memorial day observed in Commonwealth member states since the end of the First World War in 1919 to honour armed forces members who have died in the line of duty. The day is also marked by war remembrances in several other non-Commonwealth countries. In most countries, Remembrance Day is observed on 11 November to recall the end of First World War hostilities. Hostilities formally ended "at the 11th hour of the 11th day of the 11th month" of 1918, in accordance with the armistice signed by representatives of Germany and the Entente between 5:12 and 5:20 that morning. ("At the 11th hour" refers to the passing of the 11th hour, or 11:00 am.) The First World War officially ended with the signing of the Treaty of Versailles on 28 June 1919.

The tradition of Remembrance Day evolved out of Armistice Day. The initial Armistice Day was observed at Buckingham Palace, commencing with King George V hosting a "Banquet in Honour of the President of the French Republic" during the evening hours of 10 November 1919. The first official Armistice Day was subsequently held on the grounds of Buckingham Palace the following morning. During the Second World War, many countries changed the name of the holiday. Member states of the Commonwealth of Nations adopted Remembrance Day, while the US chose Veterans Day.

Observance in the Commonwealth
The common British, Canadian, South African, and ANZAC tradition includes a one- or two-minute silence at the eleventh hour of the eleventh day of the eleventh month (11:00 am, 11 November), as that marks the time (in the United Kingdom) when the armistice became effective.

The Service of Remembrance in many Commonwealth countries generally includes the sounding of the "Last Post", followed by the period of silence, followed by the sounding of "Reveille" or sometimes just "The Rouse". The Service of Remembrance is finished by a recitation of the "Ode of Remembrance". The "Flowers of the Forest", "O Valiant Hearts", "I Vow to Thee, My Country" and "Jerusalem" are often played during the service. Services also include wreaths laid to honour the fallen, blessings, and national anthems.

The central ritual at cenotaphs throughout the Commonwealth is a stylised night vigil. "The Last Post" was the common bugle call at the close of the military day, and "The Rouse" was the first call of the morning. For military purposes, the traditional night vigil over the slain was not just to ensure they were indeed dead and not unconscious or in a coma, but also to guard them from being mutilated or despoiled by the enemy, or dragged off by scavengers. This makes the ritual more than just an act of remembrance but also a pledge to guard the honour of war dead. The act is enhanced by the use of dedicated cenotaphs (literally Greek for "empty tomb") and the laying of wreaths—the traditional means of signalling high honours in ancient Greece and Rome.

Australia

In Australia, Remembrance Day is always observed on 11 November, regardless of the day of the week, and is not a public holiday; it is a time when people can pay their respects to the substantial number of soldiers who died in battle. Some institutions observe two-minutes' silence at 11 am through a programme named Read 2 Remember, children read the Pledge of Remembrance by Rupert McCall, and teachers deliver specially developed resources to help children understand the significance of the day and the resilience of those who have fought for their country and call on children to also be resilient when facing difficult times. Services are held at 11 am at war memorials and schools in suburbs and cities across the country, at which the "Last Post" is sounded by a bugler and a one-minute silence is observed.  Some institutions observe this solemn occasion at 1111h on the day, adding two more soldiers to the ranks. When Remembrance Day falls on a normal working day in Melbourne and other major cities, buglers from the Australian Defence Force often play the "Last Post" at major street corners in the CBD. While this occurs, the majority of passers-by stop and observe a moment of silence while waiting for the bugler to finish the recital.

History in Australia

In interwar Australia, Remembrance Day (then often referred to as Armistice Day) was a popular public commemoration. But from 1946 to the 1970s, Australians observed Remembrance Sunday following the British pattern. It is only in the 1980s and 1990s that Remembrance Day was once again systematically observed on 11 November. The resurgence of Remembrance Day became official on 30 October 1997, when the Governor-General, under the Howard government, proclaimed that "(a) 11 November in each year shall be known and observed as Remembrance Day; and (b) all Australians are urged to observe, unless impractical, a minute's silence at 11:00 on Remembrance Day each year".

In recent decades, Remembrance Day has been largely eclipsed as the national day of war commemoration by ANZAC Day (25 April), which is a public holiday in all states. Attendance at Anzac Day services boomed, while that of Remembrance Day services continued to decline. Historian Romain Fathi explains, "In Australia, Anzac Day has addressed the question of the meaning of the war far better than Remembrance Day or Remembrance Sunday. It can acknowledge loss and suffering with a nod to the sacred, while simultaneously representing imagined distinct national values such as mateship, laconic humour and stoicism. This capacity to connect the national community to the numinous explains Anzac Day's primacy over Remembrance Day."

Barbados

In Barbados, Remembrance Day is not a public holiday. It is recognised as 11 November, but the parade and ceremonial events are carried out on Remembrance Sunday.
The day is commemorated to recognise the Barbadian soldiers who died fighting in the First and Second World Wars. The parade is held at National Heroes' Square, where an interdenominational service is held.
The Governor-General and Barbadian Prime Minister are among those who attend, along with other government dignitaries and the heads of the police and military forces. During the main ceremony a gun salute, wreaths, and prayers are also performed at the war memorial Cenotaph at the heart of Heroes' Square in Bridgetown.

Belize
In Belize, Remembrance Day is observed on 11 November. It is not a public holiday.

Bermuda

In Bermuda, which sent the first colonial volunteer unit to the Western Front in 1915, and which had more people per capita in uniform during the Second World War than any other part of the Empire, Remembrance Day is still an important holiday. The parade in Hamilton had historically been a large and colourful one, as contingents from the Royal Navy, British Regular Army and Territorial Army units of the Bermuda Garrison, the Canadian Forces, the US Army, Air Force, and Navy, and various cadet corps and other services all at one time or another marched with the veterans. Since the closing of British, Canadian, and American bases in 1995, the parade has barely grown smaller. In addition to the ceremony held in the City of Hamilton on Remembrance Day itself, marching to the Cenotaph (a smaller replica of the one in London), where wreaths are laid and orations made, the Royal Navy and the Bermuda Sea Cadet Corps held a parade the same day at the  memorial in Hamilton, and a smaller military parade is also held in St. George's on the nearest Sunday to Remembrance Day.

Canada

In Canada, Remembrance Day is a federal statutory holiday and is also a provincial/territorial statutory holiday in six of the ten provinces and all three territories. Nova Scotia recognizes the day under separate legislation. Manitoba, Ontario, and Quebec are the only three provinces where the day is not a provincial statutory holiday. The Royal Canadian Legion is officially against making the day a national statutory holiday in part because the day-off aspect would eventually overtake the memorial purpose of the occasion, whereas having schools in regular session on that day would be an opportunity for children to be taught the day's true significance in a mandatory fashion.  In a more informal manner, there has been opinion voiced against the trend of Christmas creep, so that the conclusion of Remembrance Day should be the earliest acceptable time in which to mark the beginning of the Christmas holidays.

Veterans Affairs Canada states that the date is of "remembrance for the men and women who have served, and continue to serve our country during times of war, conflict and peace"; particularly the First and Second World Wars, the Korean War, and all conflicts since then in which members of the Canadian Armed Forces have participated. The department runs a program called Canada Remembers with the mission of helping young and new Canadians, most of whom have never known war, "come to understand and appreciate what those who have served Canada in times of war, armed conflict and peace stand for and what they have sacrificed for their country."

History in Canada
Canadians began to commemorate their veterans and war dead as early as 1890, when Decoration Day began to be observed on 2 June, the anniversary of the 1866 Battle of Ridgeway against the Fenians. A further observance was held on 27 February, from 1900 to 1918, to mark the Canadian victory over the Boers at the Battle of Paardeberg.

The first Armistice Day commemoration was in 1919 when King George V called on all countries in the British Empire to observe it. It was later placed on a statutory footing in 1921, when the Parliament of Canada provided that Thanksgiving and Armistice Day both be held on the Monday of the week in which 11 November fell. Charles Dickie, Conservative MP for Nanaimo, campaigned to change the name from Armistice Day to Remembrance Day, and this was approved in 1931, when Parliament accordingly amended the Act, with its observance fixed on 11 November.

Several other days of remembrance for veterans were also created, including the National Aboriginal Veterans Day, inaugurated in 1994 to recognise the contribution of Aboriginal soldiers. In 2001, Merchant Navy Remembrance Day was created by the Canadian parliament, designating 3 September as a day to recognise the contributions and sacrifice of Canadian merchant mariners.

Ceremonies

The national ceremonies organized by the federal government is held at the National War Memorial in Ottawa. These are presided over by the governor general of Canada and attended by the prime minister, other dignitaries, the Silver Cross Mother, and public observers. Occasionally, a member of the Canadian royal family may also be present (such as Prince Charles in 2009 and Princess Anne in 2014).

Before the start of the event, four sentries and three sentinels (two flag sentinels and one nursing sister) are posted at the foot of the cenotaph. The commemoration then typically begins with the tolling of the carillon in the Peace Tower, during which current members of the armed forces arrive at Confederation Square, followed by the Ottawa diplomatic corps, ministers of the Crown, special guests, the RCL, the royal party (if present), and the viceregal party. The arrival of the governor general is announced by a trumpeter sounding the "Alert", whereupon the viceroy is met by the Dominion president of the RCL and escorted to a dais to receive the "Vice Regal Salute", after which the national anthem, "O Canada", is played and sung in English and French.

The moment of remembrance begins with the bugling of "Last Post" immediately before 11 am, when the gun salute fires and the bells of the Peace Tower toll the hour. Another gun salute signals the end of the two minutes of silence and cues the playing of a lament, the bugling of "The Rouse", and the reading of the Act of Remembrance. A flypast of Royal Canadian Air Force craft then occurs at the start of a 21-gun salute, upon the completion of which a choir sings "In Flanders Fields".

The various parties then lay their wreaths at the base of the memorial; one wreath is set by the Silver Cross Mother (a recent recipient of the Memorial Cross) on behalf of all mothers whose children died in conflicts in which Canada participated. The viceregal and royal group return to the dais to receive the playing of the Canadian royal anthem, "God Save the King" sung in French and English, prior to the assembled armed forces personnel and veterans performing a march past in front of the viceroy and any royal guest, bringing about the end of the official ceremonies. A tradition of paying a more personal tribute has emerged since the Tomb of the Unknown Soldier was installed at the Canadian National War Memorial in 2000: after the official ceremony the general public place their poppies atop the tomb.

Similar ceremonies take place in provincial capitals across the country, officiated by the relevant lieutenant governor, as well as in other cities, towns, and even hotels or corporate headquarters. Schools will usually hold special assemblies for the first half of the day, or on the school day prior, with various presentations concerning the remembrance of the war dead. The ceremony participants include veterans, current members of the Canadian forces, and sea, army, and air cadet units.

India

In India, the day is usually marked by tributes and ceremonies in army cantonments. There are memorial services in some churches such as St. Mark's Cathedral and St. John's Church in Bangalore. At Kohima and Imphal in the remote hillsides of Northeast India, services of remembrance supported by the Indian Army are observed at Kohima and Imphal War Cemeteries (maintained by the Commonwealth War Graves Commission). The day is also marked at the Delhi War Cemetery. In other places in India this event is not observed. In 2013, Prince Charles and Camilla, Duchess of Cornwall, marked the day in Mumbai's St. John the Evangelist Church.

Kenya
In Kenya, the Kenya Armed Forces Old Comrades Association (KAFOCA) was established in Kenya immediately in 1945 to cater for the welfare of the Ex-servicemen of the First and the Second World Wars. The KAFOCA and Kenyan government recognise Remembrance Day.

New Zealand

Armistice Day was observed in New Zealand between the World Wars, although it was always secondary to Anzac Day. As in other countries, New Zealand's Armistice Day was converted to Remembrance Day after World War II. However, by the mid-1950s, the day was virtually ignored, even by churches and veterans' organisations.

As a result, New Zealand's national day of remembrance is Anzac Day, 25 April. Poppy Day" usually occurs on the Friday before Anzac Day.
The reason for New Zealand having their remembrance on Anzac Day happened in 1921. The paper Poppies for Armistice that year arrived by ship too late for 11 November 1921, so an RSA branch distributed them at the next commemoration date (25 April 1922, which happened to be Anzac Day) and that date stuck as the new Poppy Day in New Zealand.

Saint Lucia

Like Barbados, Saint Lucia does not recognise Remembrance Day as a public holiday. Instead, ceremonial events such as parades and other activities are held on Remembrance Sunday. The parade is held at the central square, namely the Derek Walcott Square, where the Cenotaph is located. There, members of the Royal St Lucia Police Force and other uniformed groups such as the St Lucia Cadet Corps pay tribute through commemoration of St. Lucian men and women who fought in the war.

South Africa
In South Africa, Remembrance Day is not a public holiday. Commemoration ceremonies are usually held on the nearest Sunday, at which the "Last Post" is played by a bugler followed by the observation of a two-minute silence. Ceremonies to mark the event in South Africa are held at the Cenotaph in Cape Town, and in Pretoria at the Voortrekker Monument cenotaph and the War Memorial at the Union Buildings. Many high schools hold Remembrance Day services to honour the past pupils who died in the two World Wars and the Border War. In addition, the South African Legion of Military Veterans holds a street collection on the nearest Saturday to gather funds to assist in welfare work among military veterans.

United Kingdom

Wreath-laying ceremonies, usually organised by local branches of the Royal British Legion, are observed on Remembrance Day at most war memorials across the UK at 11 am on 11 November, with two minutes of silence observed; a custom which had lapsed before a campaign for its revival began in the early 1990s. The silence is also broadcast as a special programme on BBC with a voice over usually saying "This is BBC One. Now on the 11th hour, of the 11th day of the 11th month. The traditional two-minute silence for Armistice Day." The programme starts with a close up of the Big Ben clock chiming 11 and then the programme shows different parts of the world observing the silence. The programme ends with a bugler sounding "The Rouse" and then normal programming is resumed.

Many employers and businesses invite their staff and customers to observe the two minutes' silence at 11:00 am. The beginning and end of the two minutes' silence is often marked in large towns and cities by the firing of field artillery gun, often provided by the local Royal Artillery battery.

The first two-minute silence held in London (11 November 1919) was reported in The Manchester Guardian on 12 November 1919:

The first stroke of eleven produced a magical effect.

The tram cars glided into stillness, motors ceased to cough and fume, and stopped dead, and the mighty-limbed dray horses hunched back upon their loads and stopped also, seeming to do it of their own volition.

Someone took off his hat, and with a nervous hesitancy the rest of the men bowed their heads also. Here and there an old soldier could be detected slipping unconsciously into the posture of 'attention'. An elderly woman, not far away, wiped her eyes, and the man beside her looked white and stern. Everyone stood very still ... The hush deepened. It had spread over the whole city and become so pronounced as to impress one with a sense of audibility. It was a silence which was almost pain ... And the spirit of memory brooded over it all.

Remembrance Sunday

In the United Kingdom, the main observance is Remembrance Sunday, held on the Sunday nearest to 11 November. There is a National Service of Remembrance in London, as well as other services and ceremonies in the regions. Typically, poppy wreaths are laid by representatives of the Crown, the armed forces, and local civic leaders, as well as by local organisations including ex-servicemen organisations, cadet forces, the Scouts, Guides, Boys' Brigade, St John Ambulance and the Salvation Army. A minute's or two minutes' silence is also frequently incorporated into church services.

British diplomatic missions also organise services on Remembrance Sunday. Services organised by British missions in Israel include one at the Jerusalem British War Cemetery, organised by the British Consul in Jerusalem; and another at Ramleh Commonwealth War Graves Commission Cemetery, organised by the British embassy in Tel Aviv. The Ramleh ceremony is the larger and is also attended by veterans of the Second World War.

Commemorative coins and exhibitions
In 2014 the Royal Mint issued a colour-printed Alderney £5 coin, designed by engraver Laura Clancy, to commemorate Remembrance Day.

Also in 2014, to commemorate the outbreak of World War I a huge display called Blood Swept Lands and Seas of Red, consisting of 888,246 ceramic poppies was installed in the moat of the Tower of London, each poppy representing a British Empire fatality.

On 5 November 2018 and set to continue for 4 months, about 10,000 torches were lit at the foot of the Tower's walls, in its dry moat to mark the centenary of the end of the World War I.

Northern Ireland

Remembrance Day is officially observed in Northern Ireland in the same way as in the rest of United Kingdom, although it tends to be associated more with the unionist community. Most Irish nationalists and republicans do not take part in the public commemoration of British soldiers organised by the Royal British Legion. This is mainly due to the actions of the British Army during The Troubles. However, some moderate nationalists began to attend Remembrance Day events as a way to connect with the unionist community. In 1987 a bomb was detonated by the Provisional Irish Republican Army (IRA) just before a Remembrance Sunday ceremony in Enniskillen, killing eleven people. The bombing was widely condemned and attendance at Remembrance events, by both nationalists and unionists, rose in the following years. The Republic of Ireland has a National Day of Commemoration in July for all Irish people who have died in war.

Related observances elsewhere
In addition to the Commonwealth, several other countries also use the anniversary of when the Armistice of Compiègne went into effect, 11 November, as a date to commemorate their war dead. Some countries observe other significant anniversaries from World War I to commemorate their war dead (like the date the Armistice of Villa Giusti went into effect, 4 November).

Belgium and France

Remembrance Day (11 November) is a national holiday in France and Belgium. It commemorates the armistice signed between the Allies and Germany at Compiègne, France, for the cessation of hostilities on the Western Front, which took effect at 11:00 am—the "eleventh hour of the eleventh day of the eleventh month." Armistice Day is one of the most important military commemorations in France, since it was a major French victory, and the French paid a heavy price in blood to achieve it. The First World War was considered in France as the "Great Patriotic War". Almost all French villages feature memorials dedicated to those fallen during the conflict. In France the blue cornflower (Bleuet de France) is used symbolically rather than the poppy.

Hong Kong

Though not a public holiday since July 1997, Remembrance Sunday is observed in Hong Kong, and is marked by a multi-faith memorial service at the Cenotaph in Central, Hong Kong. The service is organised by the Hong Kong ex-servicemen Association, and is attended by various Government officials and the representatives of various religious traditions such as the Anglican Church, the Roman Catholic Church, the Eastern Orthodox Church, the Buddhist community, the Taoist community, the Muslim community and the Sikh community.

Although Hong Kong ceased to be part of the Commonwealth of Nations in 1997, the memorial service still resembles those in many other Commonwealth countries. The service includes the sounding of "Last Post", two minutes of silence, the sounding of "Reveille", the laying of wreaths, and prayers, and ends with a recitation of the "Ode of Remembrance". The Hong Kong Police Band continues to perform their ceremonial duty at the service. Members of the Hong Kong Air Cadet Corps (including the Ceremonial Squadron), Hong Kong Adventure Corps, Hong Kong Sea Cadet Corps and scouting organisations are also in attendance.

Italy

In Italy, soldiers who died for the nation are remembered on 4 November, when the ceasefire that followed the Armistice of Villa Giusti in 1918 began. The Day is known as the Day of National Unity Day of the Armed Forces, Giorno dell'Unità Nazionale Giornata delle Forze Armate in Italian.
Since 1977, this day has not been a public holiday; now, many services are held on the first Sunday in November.

Russia
In Russia, Remembrance Day is commemorated on August 1 since 2012, in memory of the declaration of the war of Russia by the German Empire at the same day in 1914.

Serbia
It has been a statutory holiday in Serbia since 2012. Serbia is an Allied force that suffered the biggest casualty rate in World War I. To commemorate their victims, people in Serbia wear Natalie's ramonda as a symbol of remembrance.

United States

Veterans Day is observed in the United States on 11 November and is both a federal holiday and a state holiday in all states. In the United States, and some other allied nations, 11 November was formerly known as Armistice Day; in the United States it was given its new name in 1954 at the end of the Korean War to honour all veterans. Veterans Day is observed with memorial ceremonies, salutes at military cemeteries, and parades. However, the function of the observance elsewhere is more closely matched by Memorial Day, another commemorative holiday held in May.

Similar holidays commemorating veterans

Denmark 
In 2009 the Danish government established Veterans' Day with early events on 5 September where past and present members of the armed forces, who have done service in armed conflict, are remembered.

Germany
The German national day of mourning is the secular public holiday of Volkstrauertag,
which since 1952 has been observed two Sundays before the first Sunday of Advent;
in practice this is the Sunday closest to 16 November. The anniversary of the Armistice itself is not observed in Germany.

Ireland

The Republic of Ireland holds a National Day of Commemoration in July for Irish men and women who have died in war. The national day is typically held close to the anniversary date of when the truce for the Irish War of Independence went into effect in 1921.

Remembrance Sunday itself is marked by a ceremony in St Patrick's Cathedral, Dublin, which the President of Ireland attends, although it is not a recognised holiday in Ireland. It is estimated that some 200,000 Irish soldiers fought on the British side in the First World War with up to 35,000 killed. Additionally, some 70,000 citizens of the then independent state of Ireland served in the British armed services during the Second World War and the Roll of Honour in Trinity College Dublin lists 3617 of those who died on active service.

Netherlands

In the Netherlands, Remembrance of the Dead is commemorated annually on 4 May. It is not a public holiday. Throughout the country, military personnel and civilians fallen in various conflicts since World War II are remembered. The main ceremonies are at the Waalsdorpervlakte near The Hague, the Grebbeberg near Wageningen and Dam Square in Amsterdam. Two minutes of silence are observed at 8:00 pm. Remembrance Day is followed by Liberation Day on 5 May.

Norway

In Norway the Norwegian Armed Forces commemorate Veteran's Day. The Norwegian Parliament, the Storting, decreed that Veteran's Day would be observed on the same day as Victory in Europe Day, in Norway known as "Frigjøringsdagen", or Liberation Day. The ceremonies are held annually in Akershus Fortress, with the King of Norway, Harald V, present. The first of such ceremonies was held on 8 May 2011, with two Norwegian Special Forces Operators being awarded the War Cross for deployments in the recent War in Afghanistan. The ceremonies are observed with memorials and military salutes.

Poland

Polish Independence Day is celebrated on 11 November, and is a public holiday. Although the holiday occurs on the same day as Remembrance Day in the Commonwealth, the holiday is intended to celebrate the independence of Poland and the regaining of freedom and unity for the Polish people after 123 years of partitioning. 

However, some commemorations for war dead do occur on Polish Independence Day, as the independence of Poland was caused by the end of the First World War. Major events include laying flowers on the Tomb of the Unknown Soldier by members of the government and highest authorities, other public ceremonies and church services and school commemorations.

South Korea
The "Turn to Busan" remembrance ceremony has occurred at the United Nations Memorial Cemetery on 11 November annually since 2007. The ceremony commemorates veterans and war dead from 22 countries that fought under the United Nations Command during the Korean War. The ceremony was conceived by Vincent Courtenay, a Canadian veteran of the conflict.

See also

 Armistice Day
 Armed Forces Day
 American Gathering of Jewish Holocaust Survivors and their Descendants
 Earl Haig Fund
 Heroes' Day
 Remembrance Day bombing
 Remembrance of the Dead (The Netherlands)
 Remembrance Poppy
 Remembrance Sunday
 Returned and Services League of Australia
 Royal New Zealand Returned and Services' Association
 The Soldier
 Two-minute silence
 The Unknown Warrior
 Veterans' Bill of Rights
 Victory Day
 Victory Day (Eastern Front)
 Volkstrauertag
 White poppy (symbol)

Citations

General references 
 Royal New Zealand Returned and Services Association
 Commemoration – Red poppies Archived
 Royal Canadian Legion
 Returned & Services League of Australia
 South African Legion
 Canadian Poppy Coin

External links

 Annual Sikh Remembrance Day Service
 Remembrance Day Single Remember Poppy Day by Olly Wedgwood
 Remembrance Day For All – Towards discussion that includes everyone in our Remembrance of Canada's wars.
 The Poppy Appeal (Royal British Legion)
 Memorable Order of Tin Hats (South Africa)
 Free On-line Remembrance Day and Remembrance Week Lessons for Canadian Educators (Reading and Remembrance)
 Jonathan F. Vance: Commemoration and Cult of the Fallen (Canada), in: 1914–1918-online. International Encyclopedia of the First World War.

1919 establishments in the British Empire
Aftermath of World War I in the United Kingdom
Armistice Day
Holidays related to World War I
November 1919 events
November observances
Observances honoring victims of war
Public holidays in Canada
Public holidays in the United Kingdom
Recurring events established in 1919
Veterans' affairs in Australia
Veterans' affairs in Canada
Veterans' affairs in the United Kingdom
Veterans days